Snake Johnson is an album by trumpeter Ted Curson which was recorded in 1980 and first released on the Chiaroscuro label.

Reception

Allmusic awarded the album 3 stars with its review by Scott Yanow stating "Trumpeter Ted Curson plays his own interpretations of advanced hard bop on this somewhat obscure LP".

Track listing
All compositions by Ted Curson
 "Snake Johnson" - 7:25
 "Searching for the Blues" - 5:33
 "Blue Piccolo" - 10:40
 "Dwackdo Mun Fudalik" - 7:01
 "Marjo" - 6:40
 "LSD, Take a Holiday" - 5:25

Personnel
Ted Curson - trumpet, piccolo trumpet, flugelhorn
Charlie Williams - alto saxophone
Bill Barron - tenor saxophone
Nick Brignola - baritone saxophone, soprano saxophone
Jim McNeely - piano
David Friesen- bass 
Steve McCall - drums
Lawrence Killian - percussion

References

1981 albums
Ted Curson albums
Chiaroscuro Records albums